Star Hall was a Mission Hall in Ancoats, Manchester.

History
The mission hall was founded by Francis Crossley (of Crossley Engines, later Crossley Motors) to meet the spiritual needs of his factory workers and opened in 1889. On his death in 1897, his daughter continued the mission until 1919. At this time the building and mission were handed over to the Salvation Army. It included the Crossley Hospital, a maternity hospital, which opened in the 1920s and closed in the 1940s.

Notes

Buildings and structures demolished in 1985
Salvation Army buildings
Churches in Manchester
Theatres in Greater Manchester
Christianity in Manchester
Salvationism in England
Defunct hospitals in Manchester
Demolished buildings and structures in Manchester